Malo is the first album by 12-piece San Francisco band Malo, released in 1972. It contains the #18 single, "Suavecito". The album charted #14 at the Billboard Top LPs chart. The album's cover art is sourced from a painting by Mexican painter Jesús Helguera.

Track listing 

 "Pana" (Arcelio García, Jr./Abel Zarate) - 6:45 
 "Just Say Goodbye" (Rodgers Grant/Luis Gasca) - 8:00 
 "Café" (Arcelio García/ Jorge Santana, Jr./Pablo Tellez) - 7:21 
 "Nena" (Arcelio García, Jr./Pablo Tellez/Abel Zarate) - 6:28 
 "Suavecito" (Richard Bean/Pablo Tellez/Abel Zarate) - 6:36 
 "Peace" (Arcelio Garcia, Jr./Pablo Tellez/Ismael Versoza/Abel Zarate) - 9:21

Personnel 

Arcelio García, Jr. — Lead vocals, percussion
Jorge Santana — guitar
Abel Zarate — guitars, vocals
Pablo Tellez — bass guitar, percussion
Richard Kermode — keyboards, electric piano, Hammond organ, piano
Richard Spremich — drums, percussion
Coke Escovedo — timbales, percussion
Victor Pantoja — conga, bongos, percussion
Luis Gasca — trumpet, flugelhorn, vocals
Roy Murray — flute, trombone, trumpet, soprano sax
Richard Bean — vocals, percussion, timbales

Credits
Production, engineering and mixing: David Rubinson.
Recorded at Pacific Recording Studios, San Mateo, California during Fall 1971.
Assistant engineers: Fred Catero and Jeremy Zatkin.
Art direction: Chris Whorf.
Photography: Victor Alemán.
Front cover: Jesus Helguera.
Album design: John & Barbara Casado.

Charts
Album - Billboard (US)

Single - Billboard (US)

References 

1972 debut albums
Malo albums
Warner Records albums